Giovanni Lorenzo Gregori (1663 in Lucca, Italy – January 1745 in Lucca) was an Italian violinist and composer. In 1684, he cofounded The Musical Brotherhood in Lucca. He served as Director of music in the local palace between 1688 and 1692.

Gregori was the first to use the term Concerto grosso in a set of 10 compositions published in Lucca in 1698. He also wrote two theoretical works, Il canto fermo in pratica (1697) and Il principianti di musica
(1735).

Works 
 (34) Arie in stile francese a 1 e 2 voci, Op. 1 (Lucca, 1695) 
 (10) Concerti grossi per due violini concertati con i ripieni se piace, alto viola, arcileuto o violoncello, con il basso per l’organo, Op. 2 (Lucca, 1698) 
 Cantate da Camera a voce sola, Op. 3 (Lucca, 1698)
 Oratorio per Santa Cecilia (Lucca, 1701, lost)
 I trionfi della fede nel martirio del gloriosissimo S. Paolino primo vescovo di Lucca (Lucca, 1703, lost)
 Concerti sacri a 1 o 2 voci con strumenti (Lucca, 1705)
 La Passione di Nostro Signore Gesù Cristo (Lucca, 1735)
 La Natività di Nostro Signor Gesù Cristo (Lucca, 1735 or 1737, lost)
 Le glorie di S. Anna (Lucca, 1739, lost)

17th-century Italian composers
18th-century Italian composers
Italian male classical composers
Italian Baroque composers
1663 births
1745 deaths
17th-century male musicians